Aliidiomarina haloalkalitolerans is a Gram-negative, strictly aerobic, rod shaped, non-spore-forming and motile bacterium from the genus of Aliidiomarina which has been isolated from seawater from the Bay of Bengal in India.

References

Bacteria described in 2015
Alteromonadales